Arsen Minasian (1906–1977) was an Armenian-Iranian philanthropist, pharmacologist, scientist, and inventor who was born in Rasht, Iran. He was the founder of Gilan's sanatorium in 1954 which is the first modern sanatorium in Iran.

References

External links
 

Iranian pharmacologists
20th-century Iranian inventors
Iranian people of Armenian descent
People from Rasht
1906 births
1977 deaths
Iranian philanthropists
20th-century philanthropists